Mianabad is a village in Semnan Province, Iran

Mianabad, Meyanabad or Miyanabad may also refer to:

 Mianabad, former name of Esfarayen, a city in North Khorasan Province, Iran
 Mianabad-e Malek, a village in Golestan Province, Iran
 Mianabad, Hamadan, a village in Hamadan Province, Iran
 Mianabad, Jowayin, a village in Jowayin County, Razavi Khorasan Province, Iran
 Mianabad-e Joveyn, a village in Jowayin County, Razavi Khorasan Province, Iran